Domestic tourism is tourism involving residents of one country traveling only within that country. Such a vacation is known as a domestic vacation (British: domestic holiday or holiday at home). For large countries with limited skill in foreign languages, for example Russia, Brazil, Canada, Australia, United States, China and India, domestic tourism plays a very large role in the total tourism sector.

In British English this may also be called a staycation, a portmanteau of "stay" and "vacation", although this is not to be confused the concept of a vacation in which one stays overnight at their own home. The use of the term "staycation" to refer to a domestic holiday was popularised in the late 2000s by its use in the British media in their reporting of the increase in such tourism during the Great Recession when the weakness in the pound made travel abroad more expensive.

See also
Day trip
Staycation
Tourism

References

Types of tourism